The Gotha Go 149 was a military aircraft developed in Germany in the mid-1930s for training fighter pilots. It was a conventional low-wing cantilever monoplane with tailwheel undercarriage, the main units of which retracted inwards. The wing was wooden, while the monocoque fuselage was metal. Two prototypes were constructed, and an armed version was also proposed as a light home-defence fighter (Heimatschutzjäger) armed with two 7.92 mm (.312 in) MG 17 machine guns, but the Luftwaffe did not purchase either version of the design, and no further examples were built.

Specifications

References

 
 

1930s German military trainer aircraft
Go 149
Single-engined tractor aircraft
Aircraft first flown in 1936